Hendrik Jan Davids and Paul Haarhuis were the defending champions, but Haarhuis chose to compete at Florence in the same week. Davids teamed up with Libor Pimek and lost in the quarterfinals to Neil Borwick and Simon Youl.

Jim Grabb and Richey Reneberg won the title, by defeating John McEnroe and Michael Stich 6–4, 6–7, 6–4 in the final.

Seeds

Draw

Draw

References

External links
 Official results archive (ATP)
 Official results archive (ITF)

Rosmalen Grass Court Championships
1992 ATP Tour